Sugar Bush Lake is a lake in Mahnomen County, in the U.S. state of Minnesota.

Sugar Bush Lake was named for the sugar maple trees near the lake.

See also
List of lakes in Minnesota

References

Lakes of Minnesota
Lakes of Mahnomen County, Minnesota